Microcladia is a genus of moths in the family Megalopygidae.

Species
Microcladia pusilla Hopp, 1927
Microcladia pygmaea Hopp, 1927

References

Megalopygidae
Megalopygidae genera